Anthony Sebastian Cristillo (December 10, 1902 – February 13, 1990), professionally known as Pat Costello, was an American actor, producer, stunt double and brother of comedian Lou Costello. He is credited as the executive producer for the American television sitcom The Abbott and Costello Show.

Early life 
Costello was born in Paterson, New Jersey to Sebastiano Cristillo and Helen Rege. He served in the army during World War I and played the saxophone for bandleader Paul Whiteman as well as his own orchestra.

Career 
Costello started his career as an actor in the 1941 Abbott and Costello film Buck Privates. He also served as his brother's stunt double on the first ten Abbott and Costello films.

In 1959, after Lou Costello died of a heart attack, Pat retired from show business.

In 1966, Costello had a bit role in the Jerry Lewis film Three on a Couch.

Death 
Costello died in September 1990 of heart failure at his home in Encino, California, at the age of 87.

Filmography

Acting and stunt double work

Producing work

References

External links 

1902 births
1990 deaths
American actors
People from Paterson, New Jersey
20th-century American male actors
Television producers from New Jersey